Oscar Peterson Plays the Richard Rodgers Songbook is a 1959 studio album by pianist Oscar Peterson of compositions written by Richard Rodgers.

Track listing
 "This Can't Be Love"
 "It Might as Well Be Spring" (Oscar Hammerstein II)	  
 "Johnny One Note"  
 "The Surrey with the Fringe on Top" (Hammerstein)  
 "The Lady Is a Tramp"  
 "Blue Moon"
 "Manhattan"  
 "Isn't It Romantic?"
 "Lover"
 "I Didn't Know What Time It Was" 
 "Bewitched, Bothered and Bewildered"
 "My Funny Valentine"

All music by Richard Rodgers and all lyrics by Lorenz Hart. Other lyricists indicated.

Personnel

Performance
Oscar Peterson – piano
Ray Brown - Bass
Ed Thigpen - Drums

References

1959 albums
Oscar Peterson albums
Albums produced by Norman Granz
Verve Records albums
Richard Rodgers tribute albums